Ted Ray may refer to:

Ted Ray (comedian) (Charlie Olden, 1905–1977), British comedian
Ted Ray (golfer) (Edward Ray, 1877–1943), British golfer

See also
Ted Wray, Canadian politician
Edward Ray (disambiguation)